Dana Glover (born October 14, 1974) is an American pop singer and songwriter, known for performing film songs.

Biography
Glover was born in Rocky Mount, North Carolina, but moved to Asheville at the age of eight. At 16 she went to Manhattan for a modeling career. At age 18 she decided to become a musician; first in Nashville, Tennessee where she became a piano player and multi instrumentalist, and then later in Los Angeles. She also played in Desperate housewives.

In 2001, she recorded, for the film The Wedding Planner, the song "Plan On Forever"—a duet with the film's composer, Mervyn Warren. Later that year, she recorded her song "It Is You (I Have Loved)" for the film Shrek. Then Robbie Robertson introduced her to Matthew Wilder. Wilder produced her debut album, Testimony, which reached #43 on the UK Albums Chart.

Discography

Albums

Singles

References

Jill Kipnis: Former Model Glover makes Debut at Dreamworks In: Billboard Vol. 114, No. 42. 19 October 2002

External links

Entry at ArtistDirect.com

1974 births
American women pop singers
Songwriters from North Carolina
Living people
American gospel singers
20th-century American singers
20th-century American women singers
21st-century American singers
21st-century American women singers